Ruth Dwyer may refer to:
 Ruth Dwyer (politician)
 Ruth Dwyer (actress)